Muhammad Niaz-Din (born 10 July 1940) is a Pakistani wrestler. He competed in the men's freestyle flyweight at the 1964 Summer Olympics.

References

1940 births
Living people
Pakistani male sport wrestlers
Olympic wrestlers of Pakistan
Wrestlers at the 1964 Summer Olympics
Place of birth missing (living people)
Wrestlers at the 1962 British Empire and Commonwealth Games
Commonwealth Games medallists in wrestling
Commonwealth Games gold medallists for Pakistan
World Wrestling Championships medalists
20th-century Pakistani people
Medallists at the 1962 British Empire and Commonwealth Games